Tročany (Hungarian Trocsány) is a village and municipality in Bardejov District in the Prešov Region of north-east Slovakia.

History
In historical records the village, which was part of the Kingdom of Hungary until 1920, was first mentioned in 1270.

The wooden Greek Catholic Church of St. Luke the Evangelist was constructed in 1739, on the site of a church erected in 1338. It contains a large iconostasis with many 17th century icons painted on canvas.

Geography
The municipality lies at an altitude of 345 metres and covers an area of 8.468 km².
It has a population of about 320 people.

External links
 
 
http://www.statistics.sk/mosmis/eng/run.html

Villages and municipalities in Bardejov District
Šariš